Archeterokrohnia docrickettsae is a type of deep-sea marine arrow worm. It is the largest species in the Archeterokrohnia genus and the first to be found alive. Additionally this species displays an unusual color pattern of orange on its head and trunk with a translucent tail.

References 

Chaetognatha